CMR Institute of Technology (CMRIT) is a private engineering college located in Bengaluru, India. CMRIT is a technical and management institution affiliated to Visvesvaraya Technological University and approved by All India Council for Technical Education (AICTE), New Delhi.  CMRIT is recognized by Government of Karnataka.

Accreditations 
CMRIT is accredited with A++ by the National Assessment and Accreditation Council (NAAC). All under-graduate engineering programs are accredited by the National Board of Accreditation (NBA).

History 
CMRIT was founded in 2000 by CMR Jnanadhara Trust. It offers courses like Bachelor of Engineering, Master's degree, MCA, MBA and Doctoral programs. The CMR Jnanadhara Trust supports and manages all the activities of the CMR Group of Institutions

CMR Group of Institutions
CMR Institute of Technology
CMR University
CMR National Public School
CMR National P.U. College - HRBR
CMR National P.U. College - ITPL
CMR Centre for Business Studies
CMR Life Skills Institute
NPS International School, Singapore
Ekya School JP Nagar
Ekya School ITPL
Ekya School BTM Layout
Ekya School Kanakpura Road
Ekya School Byrathi

Courses offered
UG Courses
Electronics and Communication Engineering
Electrical and Electronics Engineering
Computer Science Engineering
Information Science Engineering
Mechanical Engineering
Civil Engineering
Artificial Intelligence & Machine Learning
Artificial Intelligence & Data Science
Computer Science Engineering(AIML)
Computer Science Engineering(DS)
PG Courses
Master of Business Administration
Master of Computer Applications
Doctoral Programmes
Research centers affiliated to Visvesvaraya Technological University
Electronics and Communication Engineering
Electrical and Electronics Engineering
Computer Science Engineering
Information Science Engineering
Mechanical Engineering
Civil Engineering
Basic Sciences
Business Administration
Computer Applications

Research
The various centre of Excellence of CMRIT
	CoE-Machine Intelligence and Big Data
	CoE-Data Driven Internet-of Things
	CoE-Integrated Circuits
	CoE-Signal Processing
	CoE-Additive Manufacturing
	CoE-Sensors and Nano Electronics
	CoE-Material Science
	CoE-Natural Resource Management
	CoE-Metallurgical Engineering
	CoE–Intelligent Energy Systems
	CoE–Intelligent Human Computer Interaction
	CoE–Robotic Systems
	CoE–Financial Markets
	CoE–Embedded System
   CoE-Modeling of Dynamical Systems

Makerspace 
 Makerspace@CMRIT is interdisciplinary, collaborative, community-oriented space equipped with latest prototyping equipment and technologies. The purpose of the Makerspace is to enable a hands-on culture where the CMRIT community utilizes theoretical skills and classroom knowledge from a wide range of content areas and experiences in real world projects.

Notable alumni 
 Varun Agarwal, Indian film maker
 Nivedhitha, Indian actress

References

External links
 

All India Council for Technical Education
Affiliates of Visvesvaraya Technological University
Engineering colleges in Bangalore